De l'autre côté du lit is a 2008 French comedy film directed by Pascale Pouzadoux and starring Sophie Marceau and Dany Boon. Adapted from the novel of the same name by Alix Girod de l'Ain, the film is about a husband and wife who decide to exchange their lives for a year in order to save their marriage. De l'autre côté du lit was filmed on location in Paris.

Plot
When routine sets into Hugo and Ariane's relationship after ten years of marriage, the couple decides to swap lives. Hugo looks after the house and kids and takes up his wife's career as a door-to-door jewelry salesman, and Ariane assumes control of a building rental company.

Cast
 Sophie Marceau as Ariane
 Dany Boon as Hugo
 Roland Giraud as Nicard
 Antoine Duléry as Maurice
 Anny Duperey as Lise
 Juliette Arnaud as Charlotte
 Béatrice Michel as Isabelle
 Ninon Mauger as Louise
 Clémot Couture as Hector
 Flanvart François Vincentelli as Nicolas
 Delphine Rivière as Samia
 Arnaud Lemaire as Kévin, Samia's friend
 Arsène Mosca as Goncalvo
 Armelle as School's director

References

External links
 
 
 Changing Sides at uniFrance

2008 films
2008 comedy films
French comedy films
2000s French-language films
Films set in France
Films shot in France
Films based on French novels
Films directed by Pascale Pouzadoux
2000s French films